The KTM 50 SX Mini is a youth Motorcycle made by KTM from 2008 to present.

Model Progression

2010
New ignition cover for improved sealing
New inner clutch hub for improved reliability
New gearbox shaft for improved reliability
New water pump impeller for improved cooling and engine efficiency

2008
First model year for the 50 SX Mini

References

KTM

External links
Official KTM model information
Full About KTM 50 SX

50 SX Mini
Motorcycles introduced in 2008